Agabus clypealis is a species of beetle in family Dytiscidae. It can be found in Denmark, Germany, Latvia, Poland, Russia, and Sweden.

References

clypealis
Beetles described in 1867
Beetles of Europe
Taxonomy articles created by Polbot